Kahl may refer to:

Places
 Kahl am Main (officially ), a community in the Aschaffenburg district in the Regierungsbezirk of Lower Franconia
 Kahl (river), a river in the northern Spessart in Bavaria and Hesse
 Kleine Kahl ("Little Kahl"), a left tributary of the Kahl in the northern Spessart in Lower Franconia, Bavaria
 Sommerkahl (Kahl), a left tributary of the Kahl in the northern Spessart in Lower Franconia, Bavaria

Other
Kahl (surname)
 Kahl Nuclear Power Plant, the first nuclear power plant ever to be built in Germany
 Kahl (film), a 1961 short German documentary film. It was nominated for an Academy Award for Best Documentary Short References
 Kahl Building (also known as Capitol Theatre), a building in Downtown Davenport, Iowa, USA

Media
 KAHL (AM), a radio station (1310 AM) licensed to serve San Antonio, Texas, United States
 KAHL-FM, a radio station (105.9 FM) licensed to serve Hondo, Texas
 KOOQ, a radio station (1410 AM) licensed to serve North Platte, Nebraska, United States, which held the call sign KAHL until 1983